Balenciaga SA is a Spanish luxury fashion house founded in 1919 by the designer Cristóbal Balenciaga in San Sebastian, Spain and based in Paris, France. Balenciaga produces ready-to-wear, footwear, handbags, and accessories and licenses its name and branding to Coty for fragrances. The brand is currently owned by the French corporation Kering.

History

Founding to 1980 
Cristóbal Balenciaga opened his first boutique in San Sebastián, Spain, in 1919, and expanded to include branches in Madrid and Barcelona. The Spanish royal family and the aristocracy wore his designs. When the Spanish Civil War forced him to close his stores, Balenciaga moved to Paris.

Balenciaga opened his Paris couture house on Avenue George V in August 1937, where his first fashion show featured designs heavily influenced by the Spanish Renaissance. Balenciaga's success  was nearly immediate. In the period of two years, the press lauded him as a revolutionary, and his designs were highly sought-after. Carmel Snow, the editor of Harper's Bazaar, was an early champion of his designs.

Customers risked their safety to travel to Europe during World War II to see Balenciaga's clothing. During this period, he was noted for his "square coat", with sleeves cut in a single piece with the yoke, and for his designs with black (or black and brown) lace over bright pink fabric. Historians believe that Balenciaga's continued activity during the Nazi occupation of Paris was made possible by Balenciaga's connections with Spanish dictator General Francisco Franco who was Adolf Hitler's close ally. The relation to Franco was so close in fact, the Balenciaga designed clothing for the Franco family.  The company was one of only 60 companies allowed to operate during the occupation, and the ongoing supply of raw materials from Spain, which were in short supply in Paris at the time due to the war, gave Balenciaga a competitive advantage. However, Balenciaga testified that he refused Hitler's request to transfer his company's activities to Berlin.

During the post-war years, his lines became more linear and sleek, diverging from the hourglass shape popularized by "Christian Dior's New Look". The fluidity of his silhouettes enabled him to manipulate the relationship between his clothing and women's bodies. In 1951, he transformed the silhouette, broadening the shoulders and removing the waist. In 1955, he designed the tunic dress, which later developed into the chemise dress of 1958. Other contributions in the postwar era included the spherical balloon jacket (1953), the high-waisted baby doll dress (1957), the cocoon coat (1957), the balloon skirt (1957), and the sack dress (1957). In 1959, his work culminated in the Empire line, with high-waisted dresses and coats cut like kimono. His manipulation of the waist, in particular, contributed to "what is considered to be his most important contribution to the world of fashion: a new silhouette for women."

In the 1960s, Balenciaga tended toward heavy fabrics, intricate embroidery, and bold materials. His trademarks included "collars that stood away from the collarbone to give a swanlike appearance" and shortened "bracelet" sleeves. His often spare, sculptural creations—including funnel-shape gowns of stiff duchess satin worn to acclaim by clients such as Pauline de Rothschild, Bunny Mellon, Marella Agnelli, Hope Portocarrero, Gloria Guinness, and Mona von Bismarck—were considered masterworks of haute couture in the 1950s and 1960s. In 1960, he designed the wedding dress for Queen Fabiola of Belgium made of ivory duchess satin trimmed with white mink at the collar and the hips. Jackie Kennedy famously upset her husband by buying Balenciaga's expensive creations while John F. Kennedy was president, he apparently feared that the American public might think the purchases too lavish. Her haute couture bills were eventually discreetly paid by her father-in-law, Joseph Kennedy.

Protégés 
Several designers who worked for Balenciaga would go on to open their own successful couture houses, notably Oscar de la Renta (1949), Andre Courreges (1950), Emanuel Ungaro (1958), but his most famous and noted protégé was Hubert de Givenchy, who was the lone designer to side with Balenciaga against the Chambre Syndicale de la Haute Couture Parisienne and also the press over the scheduling of his shows.

Battle against the press 
In 1957, Balenciaga famously decided to show his collection to the fashion press the day before the clothing retail delivery date, not the standard four weeks before the retail delivery date the fashion industry followed at the time. By keeping the press unaware of the design of his garments until the day before they were shipped to stores, he hoped to curtail ongoing piracy and copying of his designs. The press resisted, finding it nearly impossible to get his work into their print deadlines, but Balenciaga and protégé Givenchy stood firm, seriously impacting their coverage and press of the era. His supporters would argue that rival Christian Dior would gain acclaim from copying Balenciaga's silhouettes and cuts, claiming them as his own original work; because Balenciaga was not interested in press coverage, the media, and consumers never knew.

In 1967, both designers reversed their decision and joined the traditional schedule.

Battle against the Chambre 
Balenciaga defiantly resisted the rules, guidelines, and bourgeoisie status of the Chambre syndicale de la haute couture parisienne, and, thus, was never a member. Although he is spoken of with immense reverence, technically, Balenciaga couture was never haute couture.

Cristóbal Balenciaga closed his fashion house in 1968 and died in 1972. The house lay dormant until 1986.

1981 to 2010

Balenciaga is now owned by Kering and its womenswear and menswear was headed by Nicolas Ghesquière.  

In 2002, Balenciaga's star, Nicolas Ghesquière, imitated the work of Kaisik Wong, a designer from San Francisco. Ghesquiere created a patchwork vest in his spring collection that resembled one that Wong designed in 1973. Ghesquière admitted in an interview in Paris that he had copied the garment.

Ghesquière's F/W 2005 line showed that the house was not only making money, but also attracted a number of celebrity customers including editor-in-chief at Vogue, Anna Wintour.

The House of Balenciaga designed the dresses worn by Jennifer Connelly and Nicole Kidman to the 2006 Academy Awards, as well as the wedding gown Kidman wore when she married Keith Urban. Kylie Minogue also wore a Balenciaga dress for her "Slow" and "Red Blooded Woman" music videos and for her concert tour.

Balenciaga's Fall/Winter 2007 show impressed Teen Vogue editor-in-chief Amy Astley so much that an entire spread in the magazine, titled "Global Studies" and shot in Beijing, was influenced by it. The line included skinny jodhpurs, tight, fitted blazers, beaded embellished scarves, and other multicultural mixes.

Balenciaga is known for creating avant-garde, advanced structural pieces, straddling the edge of fashion and forecasting the future of women's ready-to-wear fashion. Vintage Balenciaga garments are  popular among fashion editors, Hollywood stars, and models, and have been seen on Sienna Miller, Lara Bingle, Raquel Zimmerman, Caroline Trentini, Emmanuelle Alt, Tatiana Sorokko, Hilary Rhoda, Jennifer Garner, and Stephanie Seymour, among others. Balenciaga is also frequently worn by actress Chloë Sevigny, who is also a muse of Nicolas Ghesquière.

2010 to present
In March 2011 at San Francisco's M. H. de Young Museum, Balenciaga celebrated the opening of Balenciaga and Spain, a 120-piece fashion retrospective of Cristóbal Balenciaga's career. The exhibition included many designs from the museum's encyclopedic costume collection. "You can't even measure it", said Rodarte designer Laura Mulleavy of Cristóbal Balenciaga's influence. The $2,500-a-ticket fund-raiser for the museum drew 350 guests, including Denise Hale, Marissa Mayer, Vanessa Getty, Victoria Traina, Vanessa Traina, Jamie Tisch, Gwyneth Paltrow, Orlando Bloom, Balthazar Getty, Maggie Rizer, Connie Nielsen, Maria Bello, and Mia Wasikowska.

In June 2011, the Cristóbal Balenciaga Museum opened in Getaria, Spain.

In November 2012, Balenciaga announced that it was parting with creative director Nicolas Ghesquière, ending his 15-year tenure. The brand announced Alexander Wang as its new creative director. Wang presented his first collection for the label on February 28, 2013, at Paris Fashion Week. In 2014, the Tribunal de grande instance de Paris set a trial date for the lawsuit between Balenciaga vs. Ghesquière. Balenciaga claimed that Ghesquière's comments in the magazine System had hurt the company's image. The highly publicized suit was mediated out of court.

In July 2015, Balenciaga announced it was parting with creative director Alexander Wang after three years. The Spring/Summer 2016 show was his last, featuring white lounge wear made from soft, natural fabrics. In early October 2015, the brand appointed Demna Gvasalia as its new creative director.

In, April 2021 Gvasalia presented his new Pre-Fall 2021 collection, as promoted by Vanity Teen magazine. In August 2021, Justin Bieber was announced as the new face of Balenciaga. In September 2021, the brand faced backlash when it released trompe-l'œil sweatpants with the illusion of plaid boxers sticking out the top with a price tag of $1,190.
In May 2022, Balenciaga announced that it accepts crypto payments.

In October 2022 Balenciaga announced that it was severing its ties to Kanye West due to his anti-semitic comments.

Support for Ukraine 
In March 2022 during Paris Fashion Week, Balenciaga expressed support for Ukraine during the Russian-Ukrainian War. T-shirts in yellow and blue (like the Ukrainian flag) were placed on the chairs. Creative director Demna Gvasalia recited a poem by Ukrainian writer Oleksandr Oles, "Live Ukraine, live for beauty," at the beginning and end of the show. He noted that this show is self-explanatory, as a dedication to "fearlessness, resistance, and the victory of love and peace." The brand also made donations to the UN World Food Programme to support Ukrainian refugees.

Child advertising controversy 
In November 2022, an advertising campaign posted on Balenciaga's Instagram account featured children holding teddy bears dressed in bondage and BDSM gear. Balenciaga later apologized after heavy criticism and removed all posts connected to the photo campaign. Meanwhile, the photographer, Gabriele Galimberti, said that both the children and the objects which appeared in the photos were all selected by Balenciaga. Hours later, Balenciaga apologized for a separate, earlier advertisement, in which a $3,000 Balenciaga handbag sits amongst papers which include the text from a Supreme Court opinion in the Ashcroft v. Free Speech Coalition child pornography case. Balenciaga announced that it was taking legal action against the production company North Six and set designer Nicholas Des Jardins, responsible for the advertisement with the child pornography court document, for $25 million. In response, the set designer's attorney said that Balenciaga representatives were present at the shoot, and handled the papers and props used. Balenciaga dropped their legal action on December 2.  

In another image, featuring the actress Isabelle Huppert, two art books can be seen in the background: one is based on The Cremaster Cycle (1994–2002) by the filmmaker Matthew Barney and one is As Sweet as It Gets (2014) by the Belgian painter Michaël Borremans. Some Twitter users tried to connect imagery from Barney's and Borremans' works to the court document, and based on this suggested there was a hidden message about child abuse in Balenciaga's marketing material.

The use of controversial props by Balenciaga was seen by some as an attempt of shockvertising.

In popular culture
In the 1997 film For Richer or Poorer, Tim Allen's character accidentally sets a Balenciaga dress on fire. He tries laughing at it, rhetorically asking, "What the hell's a Balenciaga?"

On January 29, 2014, the character Myrtle Snow cries "Balenciaga!" as her dying words on the season finale of FX television show American Horror Story: Coven.

Film director Paul Thomas Anderson was inspired to make Phantom Thread when he became interested in the fashion industry after reading about designer Cristóbal Balenciaga.

Balenciaga collaborated with The Simpsons to create a short film for Paris Fashion Week in 2021.

In 2022, American rapper and pop singer Lizzo referenced Balenciaga in her number one hit “About Damn Time,” singing “Feeling fussy, walkin' in my Balenci-ussies.

In 2022, singer Beyoncé released Renaissance. Her song Break My Soul “The Queen’s Remix" tracked with Madonna’s “Vogue” references “House of Balenciaga”.

Creative directors 
 Cristóbal Balenciaga – 1919 to 1968
 Michel Goma – 1987 to 1992
 Josephus Thimister – 1992 to 1997
 Nicolas Ghesquière – 1997 to 2012
 Alexander Wang – 2013 to 2015
 Demna Gvasalia – 2015 to present

References

External links

 Official website
 Paris Fashion Show 2007: Balenciaga Catwalk
 The Cristobal Balenciaga Museum in Getaria, Spain
 Professor Aiko Beall of Otis College of Art and Design on Balenciaga
 

Clothing companies of France
Shoe companies of France
Clothing companies established in 1919
Companies based in Paris
Design companies established in 1919
Fashion accessory brands
French brands
French companies established in 1919
Kering brands
High fashion brands
1919 establishments in Spain